Thomas Rhett is the self-titled debut EP from American country music singer Thomas Rhett. The EP was released on August 28, 2012, and ranked No. 3 on the Billboard Top Heatseekers chart.

Track listing

Regular version

Acoustic version

Chart performance

References 

2012 debut EPs
Thomas Rhett EPs
Big Machine Records EPs
Albums produced by Jay Joyce